= Case erector =

Box preparation machine

A case erector is an automated packaging machine that unfolds, squares, and seals the bottom of flat-packed corrugated boxes (case blanks) to prepare them for packing. These machines increase throughput and reduce labor, operating at speeds ranging from 10 to over 30 cases per minute. They are crucial for high-volume, automated packing lines.

== Design ==
A case erector is typically composed of the following key components:

- Carton Magazine: Stores flat cardboard sheets before they are processed.
- Vacuum Picker: Picks up individual sheets from the magazine and delivers them to the forming unit.
- Carton Forming Unit: Uses mechanical arms or push plates along with guiding mechanisms to open the flat cardboard and position it.
- Bottom Folding Unit: Ensures the bottom flaps are folded correctly according to the designed sequence and angles for stable cartons.
- Bottom Sealing Unit: Seals the carton bottom using OPP tape (Oriented Polypropylene Tape), hot-melt glue, or staples.
- Outfeed Conveyor: Transfers the formed cartons to the next stage of the production line, often equipped with sensors to detect proper carton formation.
- PLC + HMI Control System: manages operational parameters such as carton size, speed, and error detection.
